"Bury It" is a 2016 song by Chvrches from Every Open Eye.

Bury It may also refer to:
Bury It, a 2002 comedy short with Andy Beckwith, Des McAleer, Clare Grogan and Steve Sweeney
"Bury It", a 2012 song by Alter Der Ruine
"Bury It", a 2012 song by Palisades from I'm Not Dying Today